Morne de Vitet is the highest point of Saint Barthélemy, an overseas collectivity of France located in the Caribbean, with an elevation of 286 metres (938 ft). The mountain is located in the eastern part of the island.

The gentler slopes to the east and north are settled, while the steeper slopes to the west and south are free of buildings. The steepest slope is to the south, where it reaches the sea within a distance of 400 meters.

External links
  Saint Barthelemy, CIA - The World Factbook.

Geography of Saint Barthélemy